Our Lady of Salvation High School is a secondary school in the Dadar district of Mumbai, India. It began as a primary school in 1940, and a secondary section was founded in 1962. One feature is the regular staging of British operas by the students.

History

Establishment of primary school

Our Lady of Salvation School was started by Msgr. George Fernandes on 6 June 1940 in a small room at Mohammed Mansion, Gokhale Road, South, Dadar (w) for the upliftment of the poor and the marginalized boys from the wadis of Dadar. After Msgr. George's transfer, Msgr, F.X. Vaz took over the school as a parish school. Later, Mrs. Elizabeth D'Souza (then Mrs. Elizabeth Lobo) took over from Ms. Ida Lawrence and was headmistress for ten years. Mrs. Cissy Mendonca was appointed Headmistress around June 1950. By now, the school was shifted to two rooms in Ekbal building. Later, when the Dadar Convent shifted to a new school building at Prabhadevi, the primary school occupied the building next to the church. In 1962, an application was made to the education department to start a secondary school to meet the needs of the growing number of children. On 10 June 1962, the secondary section started and was named Our Lady of Salvation High School.

Establishment of secondary school

The first principals of the secondary school were Fr. Phillip D'Souza, Fr. Michael Paes, Fr. Valerian Godinho and Fr. Noel Britto. On 16 March 1968, the Christian Brothers were given charge of the school. The first principal was Br. J.A.McPhilemy, and he was joined by Br. M.D. Curran and Br. L. Mousely. To build up the self-esteem and self-confidence of the poor boys, Br. Curran staged an opera, 'The Mikado'. After that, operas have been staged at regular intervals. Br. Sebastian George was the last principal affiliated to the Irish Christian Brothers. The Christian Brothers handed over the management of the school back to the Our Lady of Salvation Parish in 2018. They had served the school for 50 years, starting from 1968.

Annual activities

Although located in a lower middle income area where the idea of an opera was unfamiliar to many, the school has produced Gilbert and Sullivan operas year after year successfully performed by students with a minimal background of English music, customs, traditions or the English language itself.

References

External links
 School website

Congregation of Christian Brothers secondary schools
Primary schools in India
Christian schools in Maharashtra
High schools and secondary schools in Mumbai
Educational institutions established in 1940
1940 establishments in India